John King is an American country music singer and songwriter.

King was born and raised in Demorest, Georgia.

He worked construction jobs as a teenager and was heavily influenced by Country, Rock and Southern rock artists. King later graduated from University of Georgia before signing his first record deal with Black River Entertainment (2014-2016).

His debut single, "Tonight Tonight", was released in mid-2014 and featured on the NFL's Thursday Night Football on CBS. Taste of Country reviewed it favorably, saying that it is "a great hook over a strong beat, all built sturdy country voice. King solidly follows in the footsteps of many modern country hit-makers, unveiling a debut single that is fun and catchy and will immediately have one hitting repeat for a second listen." It entered Top 40 on Country Airplay for the chart dated September 13, 2014.

King co-wrote Randy Houser's single "We Went" with Justin Wilson, Matt Rogers, the song reached #1 on Mediabase and Billboard Country Airplay Charts. It also scored him his first ASCAP Songwriter Award in 2016. King also penned the first Hootie and The Blowfish song to be released since 2005. “Rollin” is featured on their new album, "Imperfect Circle" that was released November 1, 2019.

The video for King's 2017 "I Still Pick Up" was voted Top 10 on the CMTcountdown. King signed Sony/ATV Nashville in April 2018.

King’s single, “Try Saying Goodbye” pulls from his storytelling prowess. It has already garnered more than 15 million streams and 30 major market radio adds including Atlanta, Boston and Seattle. It was named one of Rolling Stone’s Top 10 Country Songs, earning features from Amazon, Whiskey Riff, Taste of Country and more.

On his debut album ‘Always Gonna Be You,’ King shines light on the most important things in life: family and faith. ‘Always Gonna Be You’ is available everywhere. American Songwriter says the album “establishes the Georgia native as a boundless artist with an undeniable talent for truth-telling."

John recently broke 50 Million All Time Streams and tours countless dates with the likes of Blake Shelton, Jason Aldean, Sam Hunt and Travis Tritt.

Discography

Extended plays

Singles

References

American country singer-songwriters
American male singer-songwriters
Black River Entertainment artists
Living people
People from Habersham County, Georgia
Country musicians from Georgia (U.S. state)
1988 births
Singer-songwriters from Georgia (U.S. state)